The 1977 IPSC Handgun World Shoot III was held in Salisbury, Rhodesia (now Zimbabwe) at the end of August, and was the third IPSC Handgun World Shoot, and was won by Dave Westerhout in front of his Rhodesian teammate and second-place winner Peter Maunder by 116.403 points and third-place winner Raul Walters of United States with further 41.741 points.

After the World Shoot, Westerhout was also honoured as the Rhodesian Sportsman of the Year for 1977 and was awarded the John Hopley Memorial Trophy.

Up till 1977 the World Shoots had been held once a year, but subsequent championships were to be held once every two years.

Equipment 
Dave Westerhout shot minor power factor using a double stack Browning Hi-Power in 9×19mm equipped with an aluminum Bomar sight rib and a stock 13 round capacity. Silver winner Peter Maunder of Rhodesia also shot 9×19mm minor using a Hi-power, while bronze winner Raul Walters of USA shot a 7-round capacity 1911 in major caliber .45 ACP. Fourth place Vidar Nakling from Norway used an 8-round capacity SIG P210 in 9×19mm minor. Fifth place Tommy Campbell of USA and sixth place Ray Chapman of USA both used major 7 round capacity 1911's in major .45 ACP like the bronze winner Raul Walters.

Champions 
Individual
Both Ray Chapman and Dave Westerhout was highly seeded before the match. Dave had already represented both Great Britain and Rhodesia in international competitions, and later also represented Zimbabwe at the 1980 Summer Olympics in Rapid Fire Pistol.

Teams
After six days of shooting the Rhodesian team claimed its second World Championship win in a row with the small margin of 41.010 points to the U.S. team. During the match there was never many points separating the two teams and the lead was traded throughout the match. Finally the results had to checked with a computer, and it wasn't until some time after the shooting was over that the Rhodesian team was declared as winners. South Africa came in third followed by Great Britain, West Germany and Belgium.

(Other teams: Australia, Norway, and Switzerland.)

See also 
IPSC Rifle World Shoots
IPSC Shotgun World Shoot
IPSC Action Air World Shoot

References

Match Report - 1977 Handgun World Shoot, Rhodesia

1977
1977 in shooting sports
1977 in Rhodesia
Sport in Rhodesia
International sports competitions hosted by Zimbabwe